The New York Rangers are a professional ice hockey team based in Manhattan, New York. They are members of the Metropolitan Division of the Eastern Conference of the National Hockey League (NHL). Playing their home games at Madison Square Garden, the Rangers are one of the oldest teams in the NHL, having joined in 1926 as an expansion franchise, and are part of the group of teams referred to as the Original Six.  The Rangers were the first NHL franchise in the United States to win the Stanley Cup, which they have done four times (most recently in 1994). The team is commonly referred to by its famous nickname, "The Broadway Blueshirts", or more commonly in New York media, as simply the "Blueshirts". The team has had eleven general managers since their inception, not including Conn Smythe. Smythe built the first Rangers team but was fired prior to the start of the inaugural season.

Key

General managers

See also
List of NHL general managers

Notes
 A running total of the number of general managers of the franchise. Thus any general manager who has two or more separate terms as general manager is only counted once.

References

New York Rangers
 
New York Rangers general managers
general managers